Khalifeh Ha (also Romanized as Khalīfeh Hā) is a village in Gurani Rural District, Gahvareh District, Dalahu County, Kermanshah Province, Iran. At the 2006 census, its population was 74, in 17 families.

References 

Populated places in Dalahu County